The Music Hall Guild of Great Britain and America and the Theatre and Film Guild of Great Britain and America is a registered theatre charity and non-profit making theatre organisation based in London.  The Guild's patrons include Brian Croucher, Anita Dobson, Sheila Ferguson, Jessica Martin, Lorraine Chase, Gillian Gregory, Mark Lester, and Shani Wallis.

The aims of the Guild are:
To advance education through the presentation of music hall and theatre productions and encouragement of the Arts; and
To advance education in the history of Music Hall and Theatre performers by undertaking research and identifying, restoring, erecting and beautifying memorials which are of educational Interest.

The Guild's activities include research, the collection of theatre archive, exhibitions, professional theatre productions, reminiscence, educational and restoration projects.  The Guild erects commemorative blue plaques and cares for the final resting places of many music hall, variety, vaudeville, musical comedy, theatre and pantomime artistes, including Nelly Power, George Leybourne, Albert Chevalier, Herbert Campbell, Edmund Payne, Kay Kendall, Marie Lloyd, Lupino Lane, Dan Leno and Gabrielle Ray.

The Guild had an income of £57,854 in 2009–10, the majority of which was spent on restoration and commemoration projects.

Projects

References

Further reading

Music hall
Organizations established in 1985
Charities based in London
1985 establishments in England